Ron van Bruchem (born 20 April 1967) is a Dutch speedcuber living in Almere. He helped create the current resurge of Rubik's Cube enthusiasm by founding the international speedcubing community and organizing international competitions. He is also a founder, delegate and former chairman of the World Cube Association, an organization aiming at the spread of speedcubing as a regulated sport. He is also the host of the website speedcubing.com.

In 1999 the first modern age speedcubers found each other on internet via Rubik's Games, a computer game with an electronic version of Rubik's Cube. Chris Hardwick from Raleigh, NC founded a Yahoo Group Speedsolvingrubikscube and the Unofficial World Records, a place where cubers could post their personal records. Ron van Bruchem started speedcubing.com together with his friend Ton Dennenbroek, an avid puzzle collector. Because the first cubers were living all over the world they wanted to organize a competition where they could all meet. After failing in 2001, under guidance of Dan Gosbee they finally succeeded to organize World Championship 2003 in Toronto. This first modern age Rubik's Cube competition was a huge success, but there were many issues because of insufficient regulation. After WC 2003 Ron van Bruchem and Tyson Mao started organizing competitions in The Netherlands/Germany and at Caltech in USA. In 2004 they started the World Cube Association which nowadays organizes competitions in over 90 countries.

World records
Ron van Bruchem has held official world records for solving the Rubik's Cube (9.55 seconds) set at the Dutch Nationals 2007 (lost 2008), the 5x5x5 cube in 2006 (1:47.22 min) set at Belgian Open 2006 (lost 2006), and 2x2x2 cube (2.65 seconds) set at UK Open 2007 (lost 2008).

Personal life
Ron van Bruchem was born in Hilversum, The Netherlands. He was partially raised in a facility for children of Salvation Army. After his studies he has been working for Rabobank for over 25 years now.
Ron has a daughter Julia (December 1997).

External links
Ron van Bruchem's listing on http://www.worldcubeassociation.org

1967 births
Living people
Dutch speedcubers
Sportspeople from Amstelveen